Thapsia snelli is a species of air-breathing land snail or semi-slug, a terrestrial pulmonate gastropod mollusk in the family Urocyclidae.

Distribution
This species is endemic to Mauritius.

References

Thapsia
Gastropods described in 1925
Taxonomy articles created by Polbot
Endemic fauna of Mauritius